The 2021 UT Arlington Mavericks softball team represented the University of Texas at Arlington during the 2020 NCAA Division I softball season. The Mavericks played their home games at Allan Saxe Field. The Mavericks were led by fourth-year head coach Peejay Brun and were members of the Sun Belt Conference.

Preseason

Sun Belt Conference Coaches Poll
The Sun Belt Conference Coaches Poll was released on February 8, 2021. UT Arlington was picked to finish fourth in the Sun Belt Conference with 68 votes.

National Softball Signing Day

Roster

Coaching staff

Schedule and results

Schedule Source:
*Rankings are based on the team's current ranking in the NFCA/USA Softball poll.

Posteason

Conference Accolades 
Player of the Year: Ciara Bryan – LA
Pitcher of the Year: Summer Ellyson – LA
Freshman of the Year: Sara Vanderford – TXST
Newcomer of the Year: Ciara Bryan – LA
Coach of the Year: Gerry Glasco – LA

All Conference First Team
Ciara Bryan (LA)
Summer Ellyson (LA)
Sara Vanderford (TXST)
Leanna Johnson (TROY)
Jessica Mullins (TXST)
Olivia Lackie (USA)
Kj Murphy (UTA)
Katie Webb (TROY)
Jayden Mount (ULM)
Kandra Lamb (LA)
Kendall Talley (LA)
Meredith Keel (USA)
Tara Oltmann (TXST)
Jade Sinness (TROY)
Katie Lively (TROY)

All Conference Second Team
Kelly Horne (TROY)
Meagan King (TXST)
Mackenzie Brasher (USA)
Bailee Wilson (GASO)
Makiya Thomas (CCU)
Kaitlyn Alderink (LA)
Abby Krzywiecki (USA)
Kenzie Longanecker (APP)
Alissa Dalton (LA)
Julie Rawls (LA)
Korie Kreps (ULM)
Kayla Rosado (CCU)
Justice Milz (LA)
Gabby Buruato (APP)
Arieann Bell (TXST)

References:

References

UT Arlington
UT Arlington Mavericks softball
UT Arlington Mavericks softball seasons